The Shore Region of the state of New Jersey encompasses Monmouth and Ocean Counties, and is part of the Jersey Shore. It is one of six such officially recognized tourism regions, the others being the Greater Atlantic City Region, the Southern Shore Region, the Delaware River Region, the Skylands Region and the Gateway Region. Traditionally a leader in tourism, the shore region holds 15.1% of the state's tourism, ranking 3rd in New Jersey. Since both counties have long stretches of beach, most of the tourism money is generated from the near shore areas of this region.

Geography
There are, however, a few exceptions, including Mount Mitchill in Atlantic Highlands, New Jersey. It has a panoramic view of the Raritan Bay, New York City and Sandy Hook. It is near the Twin Lights Lighthouse in Highlands, NJ, and is the location of the Monmouth County 9-11 Memorial. It was named after Samuel Latham Mitchill, who determined the height of the hill, near Locust. At the northeastern tip, a sand spit called Sandy Hook is part of the Gateway National Recreation Area. Continuing south on this stretch of shore, there are famous beaches such as Deal, Long Branch, and Sea Bright. The northern edge of the region runs alongside Lower New York Bay.

In Ocean County, long stretches of barrier islands make major harbors impractical, but the area has drawn much attention for its many sailing programs.

Economy

The biggest source of income in the shore region comes from the tourism industry with makes up 85% of employment in the area it is a vital source of income for many families and local businesses the employment growth in the area is higher than that in the rest of the state though housing development is considerably lower in the area though in the northern coastal region they rely mostly on industrial jobs this area accounts for about 57% of total state employment though their employment growth is lower than the state average

Demographics

As of the census of 2000, there were 1,126,207 people, 424,638 households, 298, 194 families, with a population density of 406.5/km2. The Shore Region is 88.72% White, 5.25% African American, 2.63% Asian, .02% Pacific Islander, 1.48% Other; 5.61% of the peoples where Hispanic/Latino regardless of descent.

Tourism

Shore Institute for Contemporary Art
National Register of Historic Places listings in Monmouth County, New Jersey
National Register of Historic Places listings in Ocean County, New Jersey

References

External links
Shore Region Tourism Council (covering Monmouth and Ocean Counties)
More Than a Day at the Beach: The Shore Region

Geography of Monmouth County, New Jersey
Ocean Counties
Jersey Shore
Tourism regions of New Jersey